The Majority Leader of the Michigan Senate is the leader of the majority party in the upper chamber of the Michigan Legislature. Elected by the members of the majority caucus, the majority leader has the authority under the rules of the Senate to name members to committees, refer legislation to committee, and perform other duties required by the rules or by state law.

References

Senate majority leaders
Michigan
M